Lisa Morris-Julian is a Trinidad and Tobago People's National Movement politician. She has served as a Member of Parliament in the House of Representatives for D'Abadie/O'Meara since the 2020 general election. She is also currently a Minister in the Ministry of Education. She was the mayor of Arima between 2013 and 2020.

Early life 
Her mother is Ann Morris and she is the eldest of seven children, six girls and a boy. Her grandfather, Leroy Morris, was a former mayor of Arima and her grandmother and great-uncle were both councillors. She attended Arima Girls’ RC School, St. Joseph's Convent, St. Joseph, and St Augustine Secondary School. She studied literature at the University of the West Indies at St. Augustine with a minor in politics.

She became a teacher and taught English literature and language, communication, and theatre at Barataria South Secondary School and Arima Central Secondary School. She also worked as a Caribbean Examinations Council examiner. Morris-Julian became an amateur playwright as a teacher, winning several awards at the Secondary Schools' Drama Festival and appearing on the Cropper Foundation's list of emerging Caribbean writers.

Political career 
She first became involved in politics in 2013, when she ran as a People's National Movement candidate to be the councillor for Arima Central. She was the councillor from 2013 to 2020, becoming the deputy mayor in 2015. In 2016, she became the mayor of Arima, replacing Anthony Garcia.

Morris-Julian was elected to the Trinidad and Tobago House of Representatives on 10 August 2020 after the 2020 general election. She is a member of the People's National Movement for the electoral district of D'Abadie/O'Meara. On 19 August 2020, she was appointed to be a Minister in the Ministry of Education. On 9 November 2020, she was named to the Joint Select Committees of Public Administration and Appropriations, Government Assurances, Human Rights, Equality and Diversity, Land and Physical Infrastructure, and Local Authorities, Service Commissions and Statutory Authorities.

Personal life 
She is married to Daniel Julian and they have five children: two sons, two daughters, and a foster daughter.

References 

Living people
Year of birth missing (living people)
University of the West Indies alumni
People's National Movement politicians
Members of the House of Representatives (Trinidad and Tobago)
21st-century Trinidad and Tobago women politicians
21st-century Trinidad and Tobago politicians
Women government ministers of Trinidad and Tobago
Government ministers of Trinidad and Tobago